Violet Helen Maude Farrell (20 August 1913 – 22 April 1989) was an English-born New Zealand cricketer who played as a wicket-keeper. She appeared in three Test matches for New Zealand between 1948 and 1954. She played domestic cricket for Wellington.

References

External links
 
 

1913 births
1989 deaths
Cricketers from Greater London
New Zealand women cricketers
New Zealand women Test cricketers
Wellington Blaze cricketers
British emigrants to New Zealand
New Zealand expatriate sportspeople in England